Hockey WA is the organisation responsible for the sport of Field Hockey in the state of Western Australia. Hockey WA is represented in the Australian Hockey League competition by the SmokeFree WA Thundersticks and the SmokeFree WA Diamonds. Hockey WA also run the top club competitions in Australia, the Melville Toyota League for both Men and Women.

In late 2003, Hockey WA was formed from a merger between the Western Australian Men's Hockey Association and the Western Australian Women's Hockey Association. It is approaching 100 years since the establishment of the individual Associations and it is anticipated that the amalgamation will be of major benefit to Hockey in Western Australia.

Early history

Early records indicated that hockey matches were taking place in Western Australia around 1903 and that by 1906 four Teams existed in the Perth area. In 1906 an inter-club competition had begun and by 1908 the Western Australian Hockey Association had been formed.

Games involving women and particularly schoolgirls were reported in the early 1900s and the Western Australian Women’s Hockey Association was officially formed on 14 June 1916.

The Western Australian Association decided to adopt the Rules and Regulations of The Hockey Association and sought affiliation with that England based body in 1907.

The early Western Australian teams were mainly located in the Perth area. However the Wilberforce Club Team emerged in 1906 and carried the name of the Hamersley Farm and Homestead, which was situated near York. The Wilberforce team was a family affair and for many of the matches the team mainly comprised the members of two families. The opposing teams were required to travel (by train) back and forth to York and to the City (some 100 kilometres each way) to complete their match programme.

The condition of some of the playing surfaces that were available in these early times was reported to be "poor". However, this may have been partly acceptable to the match participants who were often referred to as being "enthusiastic and robust". The "Association Ground" was the W.A.C.A Cricket Ground of today and was one of the better pitches and regular venues for the hockey matches. Matches were also played at the Royal Agricultural Society's Claremont Show-Grounds and at the South Perth Zoological Gardens.

In the first few years up to six teams including Perth, Wilberforce, Fremantle, YMCA, Claremont and Guildford engaged in hard-fought games in an endeavor to win the Hope Cup, which had been donated by Dr. Hope and was contested by the top grade teams from 1908. Early honors were shared between the Perth and Wilberforce Clubs. In the five-year period from 1908 to 1912 Wilberforce won the Cup three times and Perth won twice.

Inter-Club matches continued until 1915 when World War I intervened and it was in the early 1920s before hockey resumed on a competitive basis. The formation of an Australian Hockey Association had been under consideration and was formalised on 29 June 1925 when the first Annual General Meeting was held in Sydney.

In 1928, Western Australia participated for the first time in an Australian Senior Championship. The Team traveled by Ocean Liner across the Bight to Adelaide to contest the Title, which was ultimately won by the Home Team. Following this, the other States agreed to travel to Perth to take part in the 1929 Carnival, which coincided with this State's Centenary year. Western Australia had its first Title victory in that special year and went on to win the Championship twice in the 1930s and was a strong contender thereafter.

After the Second World War and in the late 1940s, the hockey standards in Western Australia and to a lesser extent in other parts of Australia were strengthened by an influx of skillful and promising young players and coaches, particularly from India, who came to settle in Australia after Independence was gained.

The Senior Inter-State Championship was held annually and the venue rotated among the States. Western Australia was a prominent force. In the period from 1928 to 1992, Western Australia won 29 of the 61 Championships held and this included a nine-year period (1962–70) when eight titles were won. Since 1992, the National Hockey League has become the major annual inter-state competition and Western Australia has won six of the twelve Titles contested to date.

The Western Australian Women's Teams have also been successful at National Championship level. After first competing in 1921, Western Australia won the Championship on 43 occasions including 30 wins in the 35-year period (1957–1991).

These successful State Teams made strong contributions to the development of players and aided selection in Australia's Men and Women's National and International teams. In addition, Perth has been be acknowledged to be the center of strong top-level inter-Club competition.

National Championships

Men

AHL
1991 – present
Champions: 1992, 1993, 1995, 1999, 2000, 2002, 2008, 2009, 2011

Open
Champions: 1929, 1936, 1938, 1950, 1955, 1956, 1958, 1960, 1962, 1963, 1964, 1965, 1966, 1967, 1969, 1970, 1972, 1974, 1975, 1976, 1977, 1979, 1981, 1982, 1983, 1984, 1986, 1987, 1991

Under 21
Champions: 1946, 1948, 1949, 1951, 1952, 1962, 1966, 1967, 1974, 1982, 1983, 1988, 1989, 1996, 2002, 2005, 2011, 2022

Under 18
Champions: 1952, 1953, 1954, 1955, 1957, 1958, 1962, 1970, 1973, 1984, 1990, 1991, 1998, 2002, 2004, 2005, 2015, 2016

Under 15
Champions: 1982, 1983, 1996, 1999, 2001, 2015

Women

AHL
1993 – present
Champions: 1994, 2004, 2006, 2007, 2008, 2010

Open
Champions: 1929, 1938, 1939, 1946, 1947, 1948, 1949, 1950, 1951, 1952, 1953, 1955, 1956, 1957, 1958, 1959, 1960, 1962, 1963, 1964, 1965, 1966, 1967, 1968, 1969, 1970, 1972, 1973, 1974, 1975, 1976, 1977, 1979, 1981, 1982, 1985, 1986, 1987, 1988, 1989, 1990, 1991

Under 21
Champions: 1985, 1988, 2008, 2011

Under 18
Champions: 1979, 1985, 1987, 1996, 1997, 2006

Under 15
Champions: 2005, 2008,

State League

Men's Competition

Premier League
Consists of 12 teams, who play each other on a Home & Away basis covering 22 rounds. At the completion of the season the Minor Premier is awarded the Guth Ardagh flag.

Following the regular season a finals series is played by the top 5 teams to determine the Premier, who is awarded the L.R. Connell Trophy.

Guth Ardagh pennant is awarded to the team that finishes the season on top of the premiership ladder, otherwise known as the minor premiership.

Challenge Cup
A mini-final is played between the top 2 teams after the completion of round 11, the winner is awarded the Challenge Cup. This competition ceased to be played after 2012 due to the tight schedule.

Champion Club (R & I Cup)
Was a knockout competition open to all clubs across the state. Inaugurated in 1978 and proved to be hugely successful in bringing together clubs from the Perth metropolitan areas with their country counterparts it ceased to be run after 1992.

Promotion & Relegation
The bottom 2 teams at the end of the Regular season play a round robin series with the top 2 teams from the 1B competition. The top 2 teams from this series will play in the Premier League the following season, while the bottom 2 will play in the 1B competition.

Total Premierships

Year by Year

Awards

Olympians' Medal
Awarded annually to the Fairest and Best player in the men's first division competition. Umpires award one set of votes for each qualifying season game on a 5-4-3-2-1 basis with votes confidentially tabulated by Hockey WA and awarded at the Annual Dinner.

Eric Pearce Top Goalscorer Award
Named in 2009 after prolific West Australian and Australian Striker Eric Pearce. Is Awarded to the top Goalscorer from the Premier League regular season.

Just Hockey Top Goalkeeper Award
Is awarded to the goalkeeper from the Premier League that polls the most votes in the Olympians' Medal.

Paul Gaudoin Youth Award
Is awarded to the player Under 21 years of age, who polls the most votes during the Premier League regular season.  Is named after former West Australian and Australian Captain Paul Gaudoin.

Merv Adams Medal
Is awarded to the fairest and best player from the Premier League Grand Final.

Roll of Honour

Women's Competition

Premier League
Consists of 10 teams, who play each other on a Home & Away basis covering 18 rounds, 18 matches each. At the completion of the season the Minor Premier is awarded the May Campbell flag.

Following the regular season a finals series is played by the top 4 teams to determine the Premier.

May Campbell pennant is awarded to the team that finishes the season on top of the premiership ladder, otherwise known as the minor premiership.

Challenge Cup
A mini-final is played between the top 2 teams after the completion of round 11, the winner is awarded the Challenge Cup. This competition ceased to be played after 2012 due to the tight schedule.

Champion Club (R & I Cup)
Was a knockout competition open to all clubs across the state. Inaugurated in 1978 and proved to be hugely successful in bringing together clubs from the Perth metropolitan areas with their country counterparts it ceased to be run after 1992.

Promotion & Relegation
The bottom 2 teams at the end of the Regular season play a round robin series with the top 2 teams from the 1B competition. The top 2 teams from this series will play in the Premier League the following season, while the bottom 2 will play in the 1B competition.

Total Premierships

Year by Year

Awards

Charlesworth Medal
Is awarded Awarded annually to the Fairest and Best player in the women's first division competition. Umpires award one set of votes for each qualifying season game on a 5-4-3-2-1 basis with votes confidentially tabulated by Hockey WA and awarded at the Annual Dinner.
The Medal is named after Ric Charlesworth, Former Captain of WA & Australia, and Hockeyroos Coach from 1994–2000, where he guided them to 2 World Cups (1994, 1998) & 2 Olympic Gold Medals (1996, 2000).

Jackie Pereira Top Goalscorer Award
Named after prolific West Australian and Australian Striker Gordon Jackie Pereira.  Is Awarded to the top Goalscorer from the Premier League regular season.

Just Hockey Top Goalkeeper Award
Is awarded to the goalkeeper from the Premier League that polls the  most votes in the Olympians' Medal.

Rechelle Hawkes Youth Award
Is awarded to the player Under 21 years of age, who polls the most votes during the Premier League regular season.  Is named after former West Australian and Australian Captain Rechelle Hawkes.

Grand Final Fairest & Best Medal
Is awarded to the fairest and best player from the Premier League Grand Final.

Roll of Honour

Ric Charlesworth Classic
In 2020 Hockey WA introduced the Ric Charlesworth Classic, a new domestic competition comprising the top players in the state. The tournament serves as a selection event for the Perth Thundersticks, the states team in Hockey Australia's premier domestic league, the Sultana Bran Hockey One.

Results

Men's tournament

Women's tournament

References

External links
 Hockey WA 

Wes
Sports governing bodies in Western Australia
 
Sports organizations established in 2003
Hockey One